Kongsvinger Knights is a Norwegian ice hockey team based in Kongsvinger, Norway. The senior teams play in 2. divisjon.

History

The beginning
The club was created on 27 January 1961 by Rolf E. Johnson, John Bie-Larsen, Ola Norstrøm. Odd Smedstad, Terje Martinsen and Trond Dahl. They started out by setting up a lottery, which managed to collect 80 NOK. The money was used on goalie gloves. In 1961 the hockey team was accepted into the multi sports club Kongsvinger IL, by a vote that ended 19 to 1.

On 14 January 1962, Kongsvinger their first ever game, a friendly against Skarnes hockey club at Gjemselund stadium. Skarnes led 0-2, but goals from KIL players Harald Riisnæs and Odd Norstrøm balanced the match. In the third period, two goals from John Bie-Larsen and Trond Dahl, made sure Kongsvinger achieved victory in the premiere. Kongsvinger was later accepted into the Norwegian Ice Hockey Federation, and eventually became an established team in the third division.

2. divisjon and natural ice
During the 1980s, the players Tore Wålberg and Fred Pedersen arrived, and the club saw increased success. The club was eventually promoted to the second division. There were some thrilling matches, especially one notable match against Bergen, which drew about 400 spectators watching from a pile of snow on Gjemselund.

However, as the team was promoted the club faced increased requirements from the hockey association, such as an indoor arena with suitable standards. Kongsvinger was eventually relegated again, but became the last team in the top two divisions of Norway to play on natural ice.

The club then went into a decline which lasted until 1992, when an indoor arena was built. This made sure Kongsvinger could reestablish itself as an ambitious hockey club. In 2004, Kongsvinger was again promoted to the second tier division, now named 1. divisjon.

In 1. divisjon 
The team has won the 1. divisjon once (during the 2008/09 season), and has reached the playoffs for the GET-league three times, in 2009, 2010 and 2014. In 2013 the club also moved from the old, aging Kongshallen, in to a new and modern arena.

Season-by-season record
This is a partial list of the last five seasons completed by the Kongsvinger Knights. For the full season-by-season history, see List of Kongsvinger Knights seasons.

1Due to struggling economy, the board of the Tønsberg Vikings asked that the team was to be moved down one division. The vacant spot was given to Kongsvinger Knights.

External links

References

1961 establishments in Norway
Ice hockey teams in Norway
Kongsvinger
Ice hockey clubs established in 1961